The Second Battle of Seoul was a battle that resulted in United Nations forces recapturing Seoul from the North Koreans in late September 1950.

Approaching Seoul 
Before the battle, North Korea had just one understrength division in the city, with the majority of its forces south of the capital. MacArthur personally oversaw the 1st Marine Regiment as it fought through North Korean positions on the road to Seoul. Control of Operation Chromite was then given to Major General Edward Almond, the X Corps commander. General Almond was in an enormous hurry to capture Seoul by September 25, exactly three months after the North Korean assault across the 38th parallel.

The advance on Seoul was slow and bloody after the landings at Inchon. The reason was the appearance in the Seoul area of two first-class fighting units of the Korean People's Army (KPA), the 78th Independent Infantry Regiment and 25th Infantry Brigade, about 7,000 troops in all.

The KPA launched a T-34 attack, which was trapped and destroyed, and a Yak bombing run in Incheon harbor, which did little damage. The KPA attempted to stall the UN offensive to allow time to reinforce Seoul and withdraw troops from the south. Though warned that the process of taking Seoul would allow remaining KPA forces in the south to escape, MacArthur felt that he was bound to honor promises given to the South Korean government to retake the capital as soon as possible.

On the second day, vessels carrying the U.S. Army's 7th Infantry Division arrived in Incheon Harbor. General Almond was eager to get the division into position to block a possible enemy movement from the south of Seoul. On the morning of September 18, the division's 2nd Battalion, 32nd Infantry Regiment landed at Incheon and the remainder of the regiment went ashore later in the day.

The next morning, the 2nd Battalion moved up to relieve a U.S. Marine battalion occupying positions on the right flank south of Seoul. Meanwhile, the 7th Division's 31st Infantry Regiment came ashore at Incheon. Responsibility for the zone south of Seoul highway passed to the 7th Division at 18:00 on September 19. The 7th Infantry Division then engaged in heavy fighting with KPA forces on the outskirts of Seoul.

The battle 
The X Corps entered Seoul the morning of September 25th. By mid-afternoon, elements of the 7th Infantry Division crossed the Han River and captured Namsan peak. The 1st Marine Division began its assault on the city at 7 a.m. The North Koreans had heavily fortified the city. Buildings were heavily defended by machine guns and snipers, and on Ma Po Boulevard, the main road through the city, the North Koreans had established a series of 8-foot-high barricades of burlap bags, typically filled with sand, dirt, or rice. Located about 200-300 yards apart, each major intersection of the city featured such a barricade, the approaches to which were laced with mines, and which were usually defended by a 45mm anti-tank gun and machine guns. Each had to be eliminated one at a time, and it took the Marines, on average, 45–60 minutes to clear each position.

Casualties mounted as the Americans engaged in heated house-to-house fighting. Edwin H. Simmons, a Major in 3rd Battalion, 5th Marines, likened the experience of his company's advance up the boulevard to "attacking up Pennsylvania Avenue towards the Capitol in Washington, D.C." He described the street as "once a busy, pleasant avenue lined with sycamores, groceries, wine, and tea shops." Anxious to pronounce the conquest of Seoul on MacArthur's insistence by the third-month anniversary of the war, Almond declared the city liberated at 2 p.m., September 25, although Marines were still engaged in house-to-house combat (gunfire and artillery could still be heard in the northern suburbs) and the city would not be fully captured for two more days. The Government House and Changdeok Palace were captured on September 26. Sporadic resistance would continue up until September 29.

After the battle, South Korean police executed citizens and their families who were suspected communist sympathizers in what is known as the Goyang Geumjeong Cave and Namyangju massacres.

See also
Eugene A. Obregon, US Marine posthumously awarded the Medal of Honor for shielding a fellow Marine during the battle
First Battle of Seoul
Third Battle of Seoul
Operation Ripper (Fourth Battle of Seoul)

Notes

References
 
Hoyt, Edwin P., On To The Yalu, (1984), 

Battles and operations of the Korean War in 1950
Battles of the Korean War involving North Korea
Battles of the Korean War involving South Korea
Battles of the Korean War
Battles of the Korean War involving the United States
Urban warfare
1950s in Seoul
September 1950 events in Asia
United States Marine Corps in the Korean War